TMS are an English songwriting and record production team composed of Tom 'Froe' Barnes, Benjamin Kohn and Pete 'Merf' Kelleher. The trio have co-written records for a host of artists including Lewis Capaldi, Dua Lipa, John Legend, Maroon 5, G-Eazy and Bebe Rexha. They have collectively had twenty top 10 singles, sold over 15 million records, accumulated over 5 billion streams and have contributed to over fifty top 40 albums. They co-wrote and produced Lewis Capaldi's "Someone You Loved" which spent seven consecutive weeks at number one and was the best selling single of 2019 in the UK. The song was nominated for Song of the Year at the 63rd annual Grammy Awards and won Song of the Year at the 2020 Brit Awards.

Early life 

The members of TMS were all brought up in West London and met while at school. They began playing in local bands before building a studio in a garden shed. After a long gestation period that included releasing records under the name "The Breakfastaz", they broke through in 2011 with two UK #1 records in the space of two months.

Career 

Career highlights include one US No.1 single and seven UK No.1 singles for Lewis Capaldi ("Someone You Loved", "Before You Go"), Jess Glynne ("Don't Be So Hard on Yourself"), Sigma ft. Paloma Faith ("Changing"), Little Mix ("Wings"), Professor Green ft. Emeli Sandé ("Read All About It") and Dappy ("No Regrets").

For the UK Olympics in 2012, TMS had the honour of having their song "Read All About It" performed by Emeli Sandé open the Closing Ceremony, also known as "A Symphony Of British Music." The song featured prominently, being performed twice in front of a backdrop of a stadium covered in newspaper. Watched by a worldwide audience of 750 million people.

In 2019 Capaldi's "Someone You Loved" spent 3 weeks at #1 in the US Billboard Hot 100 while also topping the US AC, Hot AC & Top 40 Radio charts. It spent over 6 months in the European Airplay Top 40 Chart. It was named the biggest single of 2019 by the Official UK Charts Company, spending 7 consecutive weeks at #1 in the Official UK Singles Chart and 43 weeks in the UK Radio Airplay Top 40 Chart. It is currently certified 5 x Platinum in the UK and has amassed over 1.55bn plays on Spotify alone, currently making it the 12th highest streaming single in Spotify's history.

Songwriting and production discography

Awards and nominations 
2022

Ivor Novello Awards

• Nominated: Best Song Musically and Lyrically - Ella Henderson and Tom Grennan "Let's Go Home Together"

2021

Ivor Novello Awards

• Nominated: PRS for Music Most Performed Work - Lewis Capaldi "Before You Go"

• Nominated: PRS for Music Most Performed Work - Lewis Capaldi "Someone You Loved"

63rd Annual Grammy Awards

• Won: Best Pop Vocal Album - Dua Lipa "Future Nostalgia"

• Won: Best R&B Album - John Legend "Bigger Love"

• Nominated: Album of the Year - Dua Lipa "Future Nostalgia"

2020

American Music Awards

• Nominated: Favourite Pop/Rock song - Lewis Capaldi "Someone You Loved"

Mercury Prize

• Shortlisted: Dua Lipa  "Future Nostalgia"

Ivor Novello Awards

• Nominated: PRS for Music Most Performed Work - Lewis Capaldi "Someone You Loved"

BMI London Awards

• Won: Most Performed Work - Lewis Capaldi "Someone You Loved"

BMI Pop Awards

• Won: Most Performed Work - Lewis Capaldi "Someone You Loved"

ASCAP Pop Awards

• Won: Most Performed Work - Lewis Capaldi "Someone You Loved"

Brit Awards

.  • Won: Song Of The Year - Lewis Capaldi "Someone You Loved"

62nd Annual Grammy Awards

• Nominated: Song Of The Year - Lewis Capaldi "Someone You Loved"

2019

BBC Radio 1 Teen Awards

• Won: Best Single - Lewis Capaldi "Someone You Loved"

A&R Awards

• Won: Song Of The Year - Lewis Capaldi "Someone You Loved"

Q Awards

• Won: Best Track - Lewis Capaldi "Someone You Loved"

Brit Awards

• Nominated: Best Album - Anne-Marie "Speak Your Mind"

2018

Brit Awards

• Nominated: Best Album - Dua Lipa "Dua Lipa"

2016

BMI RnB & Hip Hop Awards

• Won: Most Performed RnB and Hip Hop Song - G-Eazy + Bebe Rexha "Me, Myself & I"

BMI London Awards

• Won: Most Performed Work - G-Eazy + Bebe Rexha "Me, Myself & I"

ASCAP London Awards

• Won: Most Performed Work - G-Eazy + Bebe Rexha "Me, Myself & I"

BMI Pop Awards

• Won: Most Performed Work - G-Eazy + Bebe Rexha "Me, Myself & I"

ASCAP Pop Awards

• Won: Most Performed Work - G-Eazy + Bebe Rexha "Me, Myself & I"

2014

BBC Radio 1's Teen Awards

• Won: Best British Single - The Vamps "Last Night"

2013

Brit Awards

• Won: Best Album - Emeli Sandé "Our Version of Events"

2012

MOBO Awards

. • Won: Best Album - Emeli Sandé "Our Version of Events"

2011

MOBO Awards

• Won: Best Video - Emeli Sandé "Our Version of Events"

References 

Living people
English record producers
English songwriters
British musical trios
British record production teams
British songwriting teams
Musical groups from the London Borough of Ealing
Record production trios
21st-century English musicians
Year of birth missing (living people)